The 2000 IAAF Grand Prix Final was the sixteenth edition of the season-ending competition for the IAAF Grand Prix track and field circuit, organised by the International Association of Athletics Federations. It was held on 5 October at the Khalifa International Stadium in Doha, Qatar. It was the first and only time that the event was held outside of September, due in part to Qatar's hot desert climate.

Angelo Taylor (400 metres hurdles) and Trine Hattestad (javelin throw) were the overall points winners of the tournament. A total of 18 athletics events were contested, ten for men and eight for women.

Medal summary

Men

Women

References

IAAF Grand Prix Final. GBR Athletics. Retrieved on 2015-01-17.

External links
IAAF Grand Prix Final archive from IAAF

Grand Prix Final
Grand Prix Final
International athletics competitions hosted by Qatar
Sports competitions in Doha
21st century in Doha
IAAF Grand Prix Final
20th century in Doha